Shoot the Rapids was a log flume water ride located at Cedar Point in Sandusky, Ohio. The ride was built and designed by IntaRide (a subsidiary of Intamin) and opened to the public on June 26, 2010. Based on a western theme, Shoot the Rapids featured two drops with the second one crossing under the first.

History
A log flume named Shoot-the-Rapids debuted at Cedar Point in 1967. The ride closed in 1981 to make room for White Water Landing. Following weeks of dropping hints on Facebook about an upcoming new thrill ride for 2010, Cedar Point Vice President John Hildebrandt announced on September 3, 2009, that the new ride would be a log flume called Shoot the Rapids, reusing the name of the previously defunct log flume. Details confirmed that the ride would be designed and built by Intaride LLC, the North American subsidiary of Intamin, on the Millennium Island location of the park (now called Adventure Island). Shoot the Rapids opened to the public on June 26, 2010, and was Cedar Point's most expensive water ride ever built.

On February 11, 2016, less than six years later, it was reported in the Sandusky Register that construction crews began removing elements of the ride's structure leading them to believe the ride was being removed from the park. Initially, Cedar Point officials did not publicly comment on the matter. Then on February 20, 2016, during the park's annual "Winter Chill Out" off-season tour, Cedar Point confirmed the reports stating that Shoot the Rapids would not reopen in 2016 and would be removed from the park. In its spot is Professor Delbert's Frontier Fling, formerly RipCord, which had been moved to the former log flume's location due to the expansion of the waterpark area, Cedar Point Shores. Professor Delbert's Frontier Fling is named after Professor Delbert Feinstein, a character appearing on the Paddlewheel Excursions ride, which was removed when the defunct Dinosaurs Alive walk-through attraction was added. In 2019, Forbidden Frontier on Adventure Island opened on the former site of the ride.

Ride description
Shoot the Rapids is themed to a journey through a rustic western environment that took riders through an illegal moonshine business. Guests boarded flat bottom, 10-passenger fiberglass boats that advanced through the attraction along a canal of water. Special effects included rock canyons, geysers, water features, and a dark tunnel.

Incidents

On July 19, 2013, a boat carrying seven passengers rolled backwards down the first lift hill and flipped over, injuring all seven riders on board; one was taken to a local hospital and later released. The ride remained closed for the rest of the season.

See also
 White Water Landing, Cedar Point's previous log flume

References

External links

 Official Shoot the Rapids page
 Construction video

Cedar Point
Amusement rides introduced in 2010
Cedar Fair attractions
Amusement rides that closed in 2015
Demolished buildings and structures in Ohio
2010 establishments in Ohio
2015 disestablishments in Ohio